The Maldives Girl Guide Association (MGGA) (Divehi, މޯލްޑިވްސް ގާލް ގައިޑް އެސޯސިއޭޝަން) is the national Guiding organization of the Maldives. It serves 7,307 members (as of 2008). Founded in 1962, the girls-only organization became an associate member of the World Association of Girl Guides and Girl Scouts in 1994 and a full member in 1999.

The Girl Guide emblem features a dhoni.

Ideals

Guide Law
 A Guide's honour is to be trusted.
 A Guide is loyal.
 A Guide's duty is to be useful and to help others.
 A Guide is a friend to all and a sister to every other Guide.
 A Guide is courteous.
 A Guide is a friend to animals and respects all living things.
 A Guide obeys orders.
 A Guide sings and smiles under all difficulties.
 A Guide is thrifty.
 A Guide is pure in thought, word and deed.

Guide Promise
I promise on my honour to do my bestTo do my duty, to Allah and CountryTo help other people at all times, andto obey the Guide Law.

Guide motto
Be prepared

Program
The association is divided in four sections according to age:
 Stars - ages 5 to 7,
 Little Maids - ages 7 to 11
 Guides - ages 11 to 16
 Service Guides - ages 16 to 21

References

See also
The Scout Association of Maldives

World Association of Girl Guides and Girl Scouts member organizations
Scouting and Guiding in the Maldives
Youth organizations established in 1962